Per Ditlev-Simonsen (born 12 June 1932) is a Norwegian politician. He was the mayor of Oslo, representing the Conservative Party, from 1995 to 2007. He stepped down on 23 August 2007 following the Swiss bank-account scandal.

Ditlev-Simonsen was an officer of the Norwegian Royal Guards, and he later attended Stanford University getting a Master of Arts degree. After college, Ditlev-Simonsen became a partner in his father's shipping company Sverre Ditlev-Simonsen & Co (SDS) in 1955. He was a partner in the company until 1995.

Ditlev-Simonsen was a Member of Parliament from 1981 to 1985, serving in the Standing Committee of Finance. From 1989 to 1990 Ditlev-Simonsen was Minister of Defence in the Cabinet of Jan P. Syse.

Personal life

Ditlev-Simonsen was born in Oslo to ship owner Sverre Ditlev-Simonsen and Lily Kaurin. He was a grandson of Olaf Ditlev-Simonsen Sr, and nephew of Olaf Ditlev-Simonsen Jr. He was married to Benedicte Werring (d. 1990) from 1960, and to Turi Klaveness from 1992.

Swiss bank account tax probe

In August 2007, the presence of a hitherto unknown Swiss bank account was revealed. The revelation came after an acrimonious divorce involving his daughter, Cecilie Ditlev-Simonsen, the communications director of Norsk Hydro. The account, which contained NOK 1.5 million had been inherited by Ditlev-Simonsen after his wife died in 1990, and he eventually admitted to not having paid the Norwegian wealth tax on it.

The revelation caused several opposition politicians to call for Ditlev-Simonsen's resignation. Erna Solberg, the head of the Conservative Party, asked that Ditlev-Simonsen refrain from active campaigning for his party ahead of the local elections scheduled for 10 September. Even if he had not resigned, the 75-year-old Ditlev-Simonsen was set to retire after the election.  The incident was believed to be a cause of the Conservative's 4 percent drop in opinion polls, three weeks ahead of the election.

References

1932 births
Living people
Members of the Storting
Mayors of Oslo
Conservative Party (Norway) politicians
Stanford University alumni
Norwegian businesspeople
20th-century Norwegian politicians
Defence ministers of Norway